Pierre-Denis Martin may refer to:
 Pierre-Denis Martin (1663–1742) (called "Martin le Jeune", "Martin des Gobelins" or "Martin the Younger"), painter
 Pierre-Denis Martin (1771-1855), member of the Egyptian Institute of Sciences and Arts

Human name disambiguation pages